Noel Burnette (13 June 1914 – 29 April 1991) was a New Zealand cricketer. He played in five first-class matches for Wellington from 1940 to 1946.

See also
 List of Wellington representative cricketers

References

External links
 

1914 births
1991 deaths
New Zealand cricketers
Wellington cricketers
Cricketers from Wellington City